The Sölvesborg Bridge is a  long walk- and biking bridge over the Sölvesborg Bay Area in Blekinge. The bridge was officially opened on 25 May 2013.

The bridge was constructed by the local company Stål och Rörmontage.

In 2016, the bridge was named one of the eleven most spectacular bridges in the world by CNN.

References 

Bridges completed in 2013
Pedestrian bridges in Sweden
Sölvesborg Municipality
Pages translated from Swedish Wikipedia